Bad Suns is an American rock band from Woodland Hills, California, formed in 2012. The band currently consists of Christo Bowman, Gavin Bennett, and Miles Morris. All of the band members are from Los Angeles, California. The group has been signed to Vagrant Records, where they released their debut album Language & Perspective in 2014. The band's sound is inspired from 1970s and 1980s post-punk pioneers like The Cure and Elvis Costello.
Their second album was released on September 16, 2016, titled Disappear Here. Their third album, Mystic Truth, was released on March 22, 2019. Their fourth album, Apocalypse Whenever, was released on January 28, 2022.

Background

Bad Suns formed in early 2012. The band is made up of Christopher "Christo" Bowman (vocals), Gavin Bennett (bass/keyboard), Miles Morris (drums), and Ray Libby (guitar). “I grew up with a lot of world music playing in the house. When I was 10, I started getting heavily interested in the guitar, and my dad began introducing me to his records from the ’70s and the ’80s. Initially Elvis Costello, then to The Clash, The Cure, and so on,” notes Bowman, “all of these artists and bands had a big impact on me, at a young age, as far as song composition goes.” The debut EP Transpose features angst-ridden riffs and ethereal vocals reminiscent of post-punk legends of the early '80s. “I started writing my first songs at that time," Bowman continues, “Though we can now reflect on that era of music, those artists were ahead of their time in a lot of ways. That’s what’s most inspiring.”

The band released "Cardiac Arrest" online, where it went viral. The Transpose EP was recorded in the studio with producer Eric Palmquist (The Mars Volta, Wavves, Trash Talk) and preceded the band's debut 2014 album, Language & Perspective. “The writing and recording process is always exciting, because it’s constantly changing and unique to each song. Inspiration comes and goes as it pleases, so a night when a song gets written is a very good night,” says Bowman. In 2014, the band opened for British indie-pop band The 1975 and later headlined a tour in small venues, such as The Troubadour in West Hollywood. The bands rising fame has led them to perform in music festivals. In 2015, they played in the Mojave Tent at Coachella.

Bad Suns released their second album, Disappear Here, on September 16, 2016. Bowman came up with the name of the album while reading Less than Zero by Bret Easton Ellis, "Maybe the second or third time the 'Disappear Here' billboard appears in the narrative, it sort of just hit me like a ton of bricks. It encapsulated absolutely everything." On October 6, 2017, Bad Suns released the single "This Was a Home Once". 

On November 13, 2018, they announced that they had signed with Epitaph Records and released their first new music in over a year, "Away We Go." On January 14, 2019, Bad Suns announced their next album called Mystic Truth, which was released on March 22, 2019. The band later released two singles that were originally intended for release on Mystic Truth but were later removed from the album. "I'm Not Having Any Fun" and "Unstable" were released on April 24, 2020, and May 15, 2020, respectively.
 On September 28, 2020 Bad Suns released the first single from their forthcoming fourth album, "Baby Blue Shades." The single was produced by Eric Palmquist, who worked with the band on their first two albums, Language & Perspective and Disappear Here.
The band has ventured into film and television for the first time by performing Mark Knopfler’s score from the Quibi exclusive short film Home Movie: The Princess Bride which aired in June and July 2020. The band released their second single, "Heaven is a Place in My Head" on May 31, 2021. On September 21, 2021 they announced that they will release their fourth album, Apocalypse Whenever in four months and released the single "When The World Was Mine." They released the singles "Wishing Fountains," "Peachy," and "Life Was Easier When I Only Cared About Me," ahead of the album's release. Apocalypse Whenever dropped on January 28, 2022, consisting of 13 tracks, including six previously released singles. On June 14, 2022, guitarist Ray Libby announced his departure from the band via social media, stating "I've decided to take some time away from playing with Bad Suns so I can explore other sources of joy."

The band released their first song with a featured artist on August 1, 2022. The song "Maybe You Saved Me" features electropop band Pvris.

Accolades
Jessica Goodman and Ryan Kistobak of The Huffington Post included the band's debut album, Language & Perspective, on their list of 2014's best releases, calling it "a rare indie release with little excess amongst its singles". The music video for "Salt" has been praised by Out magazine and MTV for its depiction of a transgender woman's struggles with her identity and transition.

Discography

Studio albums

Singles

Band members
 Christo Bowman – lead vocals,  guitar

 Gavin Bennett – bass, keyboard piano
 Miles Morris – drums

Touring
 Sam Plecker – guitar (2022-present)

Former
 Ray Libby - guitar (2012-2022)

Tours
Love Like Revenge (2017)
Away We Go (2019)
Mystic Truth (2019)
Apocalypse Whenever (2022)

References

External links

Musical groups established in 2012
2012 establishments in California
Vagrant Records artists
Musical quartets
Indie rock musical groups from California